This is a list of airports in Guinea-Bissau, sorted by location.



List

See also 
 Transport in Guinea-Bissau
 List of airports by ICAO code: G#GG - Guinea-Bissau
 Wikipedia: WikiProject Aviation/Airline destination lists: Africa#Guinea-Bissau

References

External links 
 Lists of airports in Guinea-Bissau:
 Great Circle Mapper
 Aircraft Charter World
 World Aero Data

Guinea-Bissau
 
Airports
Airports
Guinea-Bissau